The 1934 Philadelphia Athletics season involved the A's finishing fifth in the American League with a record of 68 wins and 82 losses.

Offseason 
 November 6, 1933: Tony Freitas, Gowell Claset, and cash were traded by the Athletics to the St. Paul Saints for Rip Radcliff.
 December 12, 1933: Mickey Cochrane was traded by the Athletics to the Detroit Tigers for Johnny Pasek and $100,000.
 December 12, 1933: Lefty Grove, Max Bishop and Rube Walberg were traded by the Athletics to the Boston Red Sox for Bob Kline, Rabbit Warstler, and $125,000.
 March 27, 1934: Rip Radcliff and George Detore were traded by the Athletics to the Louisville Colonels for Hank Erickson. Hank Erickson was returned to the Colonels in April 1934.

Regular season

Season standings

Record vs. opponents

Notable transactions 
 May 14, 1934: Ed Madjeski was released by the Athletics.
 August 9, 1934: Wally Moses was purchased by the Athletics from the Galveston Buccaneers.

Roster

Player stats

Batting

Starters by position 
Note: Pos = Position; G = Games played; AB = At bats; H = Hits; Avg. = Batting average; HR = Home runs; RBI = Runs batted in

Other batters 
Note: G = Games played; AB = At bats; H = Hits; Avg. = Batting average; HR = Home runs; RBI = Runs batted in

Pitching

Starting pitchers 
Note: G = Games pitched; IP = Innings pitched; W = Wins; L = Losses; ERA = Earned run average; SO = Strikeouts

Other pitchers 
Note: G = Games pitched; IP = Innings pitched; W = Wins; L = Losses; ERA = Earned run average; SO = Strikeouts

Relief pitchers 
Note: G = Games pitched; W = Wins; L = Losses; SV = Saves; ERA = Earned run average; SO = Strikeouts

References

External links
1934 Philadelphia Athletics team page at Baseball Reference
1934 Philadelphia Athletics team page at www.baseball-almanac.com

Oakland Athletics seasons
Philadelphia Athletics season
Oakland